Aurantiacibacter xanthus  is a Gram-negative, aerobic and rod-shaped bacteria from the genus Aurantiacibacter which has been isolated from seawater from the South China Sea.

References 

Sphingomonadales
Bacteria described in 2017